Paul Fischer (6 September 1882 – 6 February 1942) was a German international footballer.

References

1882 births
1942 deaths
Association football defenders
German footballers
Germany international footballers